Pseudacanthicus serratus is a species of armored catfish native to French Guiana and Suriname where it is found in the coastal river drainages where local fishermen state that it can be found in deep, rocky areas of main riverbeds.  This species grows to a length of  SL.

References 

 

Ancistrini
Fish of South America
Fish of French Guiana
Fish of Suriname
Fish described in 1840